In My Quiet Room is an album by Harry Belafonte, released by RCA Victor (LPM-3571 and LSP-3571) in 1966.  The orchestra was conducted by Howard A. Roberts and arranged by Hugo Montenegro, with musical coordination by Bill Eaton.

Track listing
"Quiet Room" (Fred Hellerman, Fran Minkoff) – 4:38
 "Portrait of a Sunday Afternoon" (Hellerman, Minkoff) – 3:15
"Raindrops" (Mike Settle) – 2:33
"Our Time for Loving" (Hellerman, Minkoff) – 5:11
"The Honey Wind Blows" (Hellerman, Minkoff) – 3:40
"The Girls in their Summer Dresses" (Jim Friedman) – 3:45
 "Long About Now" (Hellerman, Minkoff) – 4:24
 "I'm Just a Country Boy" (Fred Brooks, Marshall Barer) – 3:43
 "Summertime Love" (Frank Loesser) – 3:45
 "Try to Remember" (Tom Jones, Harvey Schmidt) – 4:04

Personnel
Harry Belafonte – vocals
Orchestra conducted by Howard A. Roberts
Arrangements by Hugo Montenegro
Production notes:
Andy Wisell – producer
Bob Simpson – engineer
Bill Eaton – musical coordinator

Chart positions

References

1966 albums
Harry Belafonte albums
RCA Victor albums
Albums arranged by Hugo Montenegro
Albums conducted by Howard Roberts